Loreto del Pilar Aravena Soto (born August 6, 1983) is a Chilean actress who is known for her role as Claudia Herrera, in the series Los 80 on Channel 13.

Biography 
She is the youngest of three siblings. She did her school studies at the Joaquina de Verdruna school in Puente Alto and later studied at the University of Chile.

She achieved recognition with her role as Claudia Herrera in the bicentennial series Los 80, aired in 2008, where she entered after a casting, in which the directors decided to immediately cast her as the character of Claudia Herrera.

In 2010, she reached third place in the circus competition program Circo de estrellas on TVN. She also joined Rock And Pop radio as an announcer on the radio program Cabeza along with Matilda Svensson. In 2011, it was expected that she would join TVN in the production of the telenovela Esperanza, however, she decided to stay on Channel 13 to be part of the successful 2012 nighttime soap opera Soltera otra vez, where she played the role of Susana "Susy" Sánchez. She also hosted the program El Rito on Radio Universo.

In 2013 and 2016, she continued her participation in various soap operas on Channel 13 such as El hombre de tu vida, Chipe libre and Preciosas, at the same time she participated in the first and second installments of the film Fuerzas Especiales. [12] In 2017, she joined the film Sapo.

In 2018, she was part of the cast of Pacto de sangre, a series that within six months of airing, received numerous awards and nominations. The following year, she joined the television series Amor a la Catalán. Aravena was released from Channel 13 in December 2019.

Filmography

Musical videos

References 

1983 births
Living people
Chilean television actors
Chilean film actors
People from Santiago
Actors from Santiago
20th-century Chilean actors
21st-century Chilean actors
University of Chile alumni